Alfa Romeo Automobiles S.p.A. is an Italian luxury car manufacturer and a subsidiary of Stellantis. It was founded on 24 June 1910 in Milan, Italy, as A.L.F.A., an acronym for Anonima Lombarda Fabbrica Automobili. The brand is known for sport-oriented vehicles and has been involved in car racing since 1911. Alfa Romeo was owned by Fiat Chrysler Automobiles, which took over vehicle production until its operations were fully merged with those of the PSA Group to form Stellantis on 16 January 2021.

Alfa Romeo began with the purchase of the main factory building of French carmaker Darracq in Milan, which was closing up and selling all its assets. Its first car was the 1910 24 HP, designed by Giuseppe Merosi. Alfa ventured into motor racing, with drivers Franchini and Ronzoni competing in the 1911 Targa Florio with two 24-hp models. In August 1915, the company came under the direction of Neapolitan entrepreneur Nicola Romeo, who converted the factory to produce military hardware for the Italian and Allied war efforts. In 1920, the name of the company was changed to Alfa Romeo with the Torpedo 20–30 HP the first car to be so badged.

In 1921, the Banca Italiana di Sconto, which backed the Ing. Nicola Romeo & Co went bankrupt, and the government needed to support the industrial companies involved, of which Alfa Romeo was among, through the "Consorzio per Sovvenzioni sui Valori Industriali". In 1925, the railway activities were separated from the Romeo company, and in 1928 Nicola Romeo left. In 1933, the state ownership was reorganized under the banner of the Italian state industrial organization Istituto per la Ricostruzione Industriale (IRI), which then had effective control. The company struggled to return to profitability after World War II and turned to mass-producing small vehicles rather than hand-building luxury models. In 1954, it developed the Alfa Romeo Twin Cam engine, which would remain in production until 1994. The Istituto per la Ricostruzione (IRI), the state conglomerate that controls Finmeccanica sold the marque to the Fiat Group in 1986 due to the marque being unprofitable.

Alfa Romeo has competed successfully in Grand Prix motor racing, Formula One, sportscar racing, touring car racing, and rallies. It has competed both as a constructor and an engine supplier, via works entries (usually under the name Alfa Corse or Autodelta), and private entries. The first racing car was made in 1913, three years after the foundation of the company, and Alfa Romeo won the inaugural world championship for Grand Prix cars in 1925. The race victories gave a sporty image to the marque, and Enzo Ferrari founded the Scuderia Ferrari racing team in 1929 as an Alfa Romeo racing team, before becoming independent in 1939. Ferrari has had the most wins of any marque in the world.

History

Name
The company's name is a combination of the original name, "A.L.F.A." ("Anonima Lombarda Fabbrica Automobili"), and the last name of entrepreneur Nicola Romeo, who took control of the company in 1915.

Foundation and early years

The first factory building of A.L.F.A. was in the first-place property of Società Anonima Italiana Darracq (SAID), founded in 1906 by the French automobile firm of Alexandre Darracq, with some Italian investors. One of them, Cavaliere Ugo Stella, an aristocrat from Milan, became chairman of the SAID in 1909. In late 1909, the Italian Darracq cars were selling slowly and the company was wound up. Ugo Stella, with the other Italian co-investors, founded a new company named A.L.F.A. (Anonima Lombarda Fabbrica Automobili), buying the assets of Italian Darracq that was up to dissolution. The first car produced by the company was the 1910 24 HP, designed by Giuseppe Merosi, hired in 1909 for designing new cars more suited to the Italian market. Merosi would go on to design a series of new A.L.F.A. cars, with more powerful engines such as the 40–60 HP. A.L.F.A. ventured into motor racing, with drivers Franchini and Ronzoni competing in the 1911 Targa Florio with two 24-hp models. In 1914, an advanced Grand Prix car was designed and built, the GP1914, with a four-cylinder engine, double overhead camshafts, four valves per cylinder, and twin ignition. However, the onset of the First World War halted automobile production at A.L.F.A. for three years.

In August 1915, the company came under the direction of Neapolitan entrepreneur Nicola Romeo, who converted the factory to produce military hardware for the Italian and Allied war efforts. Munitions, aircraft engines and other components, compressors, and generators based on the company's existing car engines were produced in a vastly enlarged factory during the war. After the war, Romeo invested his war profits in acquiring locomotive and railway carriage plants in Saronno (Costruzioni Meccaniche di Saronno), Rome (Officine Meccaniche di Roma), and Naples (Officine Ferroviarie Meridionali), which were added to his A.L.F.A. ownership.

Car production had not been considered at first, but resumed in 1919 since parts for the completion of 105 cars had remained at the A.L.F.A. factory since 1915. In 1920, the name of the company was changed to Alfa Romeo with the Torpedo 20–30 HP the first car to be so badged. Their first success came in 1920 when Giuseppe Campari won at Mugello and continued with second place in the Targa Florio driven by Enzo Ferrari. Giuseppe Merosi continued as head designer, and the company continued to produce solid road cars as well as successful race cars (including the 40–60 HP and the RL Targa Florio).

In 1923, Vittorio Jano was lured from Fiat, partly due to the persuasion of a young Alfa racing driver named Enzo Ferrari, to replace Merosi as chief designer at Alfa Romeo. The first Alfa Romeo under Jano was the P2 Grand Prix car, which won Alfa Romeo the inaugural world championship for Grand Prix cars in 1925. For road cars, Jano developed a series of small-to-medium-displacement 4-, 6-, and 8-cylinder inline engines based on the P2 unit that established the architecture of the company's engines, with light alloy construction, hemispherical combustion chambers, centrally located plugs, two rows of overhead valves per cylinder bank and dual overhead cams. Jano's designs proved both reliable and powerful.

Enzo Ferrari proved a better team manager than a driver, and when the factory team was privatised, it became Scuderia Ferrari. When Ferrari left Alfa Romeo, he went on to build his own cars. Tazio Nuvolari often drove for Alfa, winning many races before the Second World War.

In 1928, Nicola Romeo left, and in 1933 Alfa Romeo was rescued by the government, which then had effective control. Alfa Romeo became an instrument of Mussolini's Italy, a national emblem. During this period it built bespoke vehicles for the wealthy, with bodies normally by Carrozzeria Touring or Pininfarina. This era peaked with the Alfa Romeo 2900B Type 35 racers.

The Alfa factory (converted during wartime to the production of Macchi C.202 Folgore engines: the Daimler-Benz 600 series built under license) was bombed during the Second World War and struggled to return to profitability after the war. The luxury vehicles were out. Smaller, mass-produced vehicles began to be produced beginning with the 1954 model year, with the introduction of the Giulietta series of berline (saloons/sedans), coupes and open two-seaters. All three varieties shared what would become the Alfa Romeo overhead Twin Cam four-cylinder engine, initially displacing 1300 cc. This engine would eventually be enlarged to 2000 cc and would remain in production until 1995.

Post war

Once motorsports resumed after the Second World War, Alfa Romeo proved to be the car to beat in Grand Prix events. The introduction of the new formula (Formula One) for single seat racing cars provided an ideal setting for Alfa Romeo's Tipo 158 Alfetta, adapted from a pre-war voiturette, and Giuseppe Farina won the first Formula One World Championship in 1950 in the 158. Juan Manuel Fangio secured Alfa's second consecutive championship in 1951.

In 1952, Alfa Romeo experimented with its first front-wheel-drive compact car, "Project 13–61". It had the same transverse-mounted, forward-motor layout as the modern front-wheel-drive automobile. Alfa Romeo made a second attempt in the late 1950s based on Project 13–61. It was to be called Tipo 103 and resembled the smaller version of its popular Alfa Romeo Giulia. However, due to the financial difficulties in post-war Italy, the Tipo 103 never saw production. Had Alfa Romeo produced it, it would have preceded the Mini as the first "modern" front-wheel-drive compact car. In the mid-1950s, Alfa Romeo entered into an agreement with Brazil's Matarazzo Group to create a company called Fabral (Fábrica Brasileira de Automóveis Alfa, "the Brazilian Alfa automobile factory") to build the Alfa Romeo 2000 there. After having received government approval, Matarazzo pulled out under pressure from Brazil's President Juscelino Kubitschek with the state-owned FNM company instead commenced building the car as the "FNM 2000" there in 1960.

During the 1960s, Alfa Romeo concentrated on motorsports using production-based cars, including the GTA (standing for Gran Turismo Allegerita), an aluminium-bodied version of the Bertone-designed coupe with a powerful twin-plug engine. Among other victories, the GTA won the inaugural Sports Car Club of America's Trans-Am championship in 1966. In the 1970s, Alfa Romeo concentrated on prototype sports car racing with the Tipo 33, with early victories in 1971. Eventually the Tipo 33TT12 gained the World Championship for Makes for Alfa Romeo in 1975 and the Tipo 33SC12 won the World Championship for Sports Cars in 1977.

As Alfa Romeo was a state-controlled company, they were often subject to political pressure. To help industrialize Italy's underdeveloped south, Alfa Romeo's new compact car was to be built at a new factory at Pomigliano d'Arco in Campania. Even the car's name, Alfa Sud (Alfa South), reflected where it was built. 18 January 1968, saw a new company named "Industria Napoletana Costruzioni Autoveicoli Alfa Romeo-Alfasud S.p.A." being formed, 90% of which belonged to Alfa Romeo and 10% to Government controlled holding company Finmeccanica. This plant was built in the wake of France's 1968 protests and Italy's Hot Autumn and was never "properly started." The employees had mainly construction backgrounds and were not trained for factory work, while industrial relations were troublesome throughout. Absenteeism rates in the Pomigliano factory ran at 16.5 percent through the 1970s, reaching as high as 28 percent.

By the 1970s, Alfa Romeo was again in financial trouble, with the company running at about sixty percent of capacity in 1980. Since Alfa Romeo was controlled by the Italian government owned Istituto per la Ricostruzione Industriale (IRI), a deal was made where about a quarter of worker's salaries were paid through state unemployment agencies to allow Alfa's plants to idle for two weeks every two months. An aging product lineup and very low productivity combined with near-permanent industrial unrest and Italy's high inflation rates kept Alfa Romeo firmly in the red. Other creative measures were attempted to shore up Alfa, including an ultimately unsuccessful joint venture with Nissan endorsed by Alfa's then-president, Ettore Massacesi, and Prime Minister Francesco Cossiga. By 1986, IRI was suffering heavy losses — with Alfa Romeo having not been profitable for the last 13 years — and IRI president Romano Prodi put Alfa Romeo up for sale. Finmeccanica, the mechanical holdings arm of IRI and its predecessors owned Alfa Romeo since 1932. Prodi first approached fellow Italian manufacturer Fiat, which offered to start a joint venture with Alfa.

Fiat takeover
Fiat withdrew its plan for a joint venture with Alfa Romeo when Ford put in an offer to acquire part of Alfa Romeo and restructure the company, while increasing its stake over time. However, Fiat chose to put in a bid to acquire the entirety of Alfa Romeo and offer job guarantees to Italian workers, an offer that Ford was unwilling to match. It also did not hurt any of the parties involved that an acquisition by Fiat would keep Alfa Romeo in Italian hands. In 1986, the deal was concluded with Alfa Romeo merged with traditional rival Lancia into Fiat's Alfa Lancia Industriale S.p.A. Already in 1981, Alfa Romeo's then-President Ettore Massacesi had stated that Alfa would never use Fiat engines — the engines being, to a large extent, Alfa Romeo's identity — but would be happy to cooperate fully with everything else.

Models produced from the 1990 onwards combined Alfa's traditional virtues of avant-garde styling and sporting panache with the economic benefits of product rationalisation, and include a "GTA" version of the 147 hatchback, the Giugiaro-designed Brera, and a high-performance exotic called the 8C Competizione (named after one of Alfa's most successful prewar sports and racing cars, the 8C of the 1930s).

In 2005, Maserati was bought back from Ferrari and was now under Fiat's full control. The Fiat Group  then created a sports and luxury division from Maserati and Alfa Romeo. There is a planned strategic relationship between these two; engines, platforms and possibly dealers are shared.

In the beginning of 2007, Fiat Auto S.p.A. was reorganized and four new automobile companies were created; Fiat Automobiles S.p.A., Alfa Romeo Automobiles S.p.A., Lancia Automobiles S.p.A. and Fiat Light Commercial Vehicles S.p.A. These companies were fully owned by Fiat Group Automobiles S.p.A. (from 2007 FCA Italy S.p.A.).

On 24 June 2010, Alfa Romeo celebrated 100 years from its foundation.

Recent developments
Alfa Romeo has been suffering from falling sales. In 2010, it sold a total of about 112,000 units, which was significantly lower than Fiat CEO Marchionne's global sales target of 300,000. The company set about to achieve a sales target of 170,000 units in 2011, including 100,000 Giulietta and 60,000 MiTo models, but it actually sold 130,000 units that year. Its medium-term target was 500,000 units by 2014 including 85,000 from the North American market. In 2017 Alfa Romeo increased production by 62 percent, building a total of 150,722 vehicles at the company's three factories.

On January 16, 2021, the operations of Fiat Chrysler Automobiles and Groupe PSA were merged to form Stellantis and the company was renamed Stellantis Italy.

In spite of falling sales, Alfa Romeo CEO Jean-Philippe Imparato announced in 2021 that a new model would be launched every year between 2022 and 2026, starting with the much-delayed Tonale, with full electrification of new models from 2027.

Return to North America

Alfa Romeo was imported to the United States by Max Hoffman from the mid-1950s. The Giulietta Spider was developed on the request of Max Hoffman, who proposed an open top version of the Giulietta. In 1961 Alfa Romeo started exporting cars to the United States through its own dealer network.

In 1995, Alfa Romeo ceased exporting cars to the United States, the last model sold in that market being the 164 sedan.

On 5 May 2006, Alfa Romeo made its return to the US Market as announced by Fiat CEO Sergio Marchionne after a series of rumours. North American sales resumed in October 2008, with the launch of the limited production 8C Competizione coupe with Alfa Romeo models being imported by Fiat's US subsidiary Chrysler. Also in 2008, Alfa Romeo and Chrysler were reported to be in discussions over the possibility of producing Alfa Romeo cars in some Chrysler manufacturing plants that had shut down due to the company group's restructure and cost cutting. Instead, as reported by The Wall Street Journal in November 2009, Chrysler discontinued several Dodge and Jeep models while phasing in Alfa Romeo ones and the new Fiat 500.

The next significant milestones in Alfa Romeo's North American return occurred in 2014, with the launch of the more affordable two-seater 4C coupe. That year, Fiat Group Automobiles S.p.A. confirmed that its original agreement with Mazda Motor Corporation, for the speculated manufacturing of a new Alfa Romeo Spider based on the Mazda MX-5 had been terminated mutually in December 2014. The proposed model for this joint-venture became the Fiat 124 Spider convertible launched in 2015. In 2015, Alfa Romeo's return to this market was further bolstered by the automaker's display of the new Giulia at the Los Angeles Auto Show. In February 2017, Chrysler featured its Alfa Romeo brand exclusively in three ads during Super Bowl LI.

Alfa Romeo's US importer, FCA US LLC, imports the 4C, Giulia and Stelvio.

Design and technology

Technological development
Alfa Romeo has introduced many technological innovations over the years, and the company has often been among the first users of new technologies. Its trademark double overhead cam engine was used for the first time in the 1914 Grand Prix car, the first road car with such an engine, the 6C 1500 Sport, appeared in 1928.

Alfa Romeo tested one of the first electronic fuel injection systems (Caproni-Fuscaldo) in the Alfa Romeo 6C 2500 with "Ala spessa" body in 1940 Mille Miglia. The engine had six electrically operated injectors, fed by a semi-high pressure circulating fuel pump system.

1969 models for the North American market had SPICA (Società Pompe Iniezione Cassani & Affini, a subsidiary of Alfa Romeo) mechanical fuel injection. According to Alfa Romeo, the engine's power output and performance were unchanged from the carburetted version. The SPICA system continued until the 1982 model year with the introduction of 2.0 liter Bosch electronic fuel injection. Many examples of SPICA powered Alfa's are found still running,

Mechanical variable valve timing was introduced in the Alfa Romeo Spider, sold in the U.S. in 1980. All Alfa Romeo Spider models from 1983 onward used electronic VVT.

The 105 series Giulia was quite an advanced car, using technologies such as all-wheel disc brakes, and a plastic radiator header tank. It had also the lowest drag coefficient (Cd) in its class The same trend continued with the Alfetta 2000 and GTV, which had quirks such as 50:50 weight distribution, standard fit alloy wheels and transaxle.

Newer innovations include complete CAD design process used in designing the Alfa Romeo 164  and an automated/paddle-shift transmission called Selespeed used in the 156; the 156 was also the world's first passenger car to use Common rail diesel engine. The Multiair -an electro-hydraulic variable valve actuation technology used in MiTo was introduced in 2009. In 2016, the Alfa Romeo Giulia came with electrical brakes.

Body design

Many famous automotive design houses in Italy have accepted commissions to produce concepts and production vehicle shapes for Alfa Romeo. These include:
 Bertone
 Giorgetto Giugiaro / Italdesign
 Pininfarina
 Zagato
 Centro Stile Alfa Romeo

Construction techniques used by Alfa Romeo has been imitated by other carmakers, and in this way, the Alfa Romeo body designs have often been very influential. The following is a list of innovations, and where appropriate, examples of imitation by other car manufacturers:

 1960s: Aerodynamics: The 116-series Giulia had a very low Cd. Toyota, in particular, sought to produce a similarly shaped series of vehicles at this time.
 1970s: Fairing of bumpers: In order to meet American crash standards, Alfa Romeo formulated a design technique to incorporate bumpers into the overall bodywork design of vehicles so as to not ruin their design lines. The culmination of this design technique was the 1980s Alfa Romeo 75. The process was widely copied, particularly in Germany and Japan.
 1980s: The Alfa Romeo 164: The design process and influence of this car is almost completely out of all proportion to previous Alfa Romeos. The 164 introduced complete CAD/CAM in the manufacturing cycle, with very little directly made by hand. In addition, the 164's styling influence continues into the present-day line of modern Alfa Romeos. Most manufacturers incorporated design ideas first expressed in the 164 into their own designs, including greater reliance on on-board computers.
 1990s: The pseudo-coupé: The Alfa Romeo 156 and 147, while four-door vehicles, represented themselves as two-doors with prominent front door handles, and less visible rear door-handle flaps. Honda has used this design style in the latest Civic hatchback, and a somewhat similar idea is also seen in the Mazda RX-8 four-seat coupé and Renault Clio V.
2000s: The Brera and 159: These vehicles' design, by Giorgetto Giugiaro, have proven influential in sedan and coupé styling, demonstrating that concept vehicles are often immediately translatable into road car form, providing that initial design takes place using CAD systems.

Concept cars 

Several concept cars have been made by Alfa Romeo:

1950s – The B.A.T. cars
The Berlina Aerodinamica Tecnica prototype cars were designed by Bertone as an exercise in determining whether streamlining and wind-tunnel driven designs would result in high performance on a standard chassis and whether the resulting vehicles would be palatable to the public. Alfa 1900 Sprint were the basis of the B.A.T. 5, 7 and 9. The later B.A.T. 11 was based on the 8C Competizione.

1960s and 1970s – Descendants of the Tipo 33
The Tipo 33 racing car, with its high-revving 2000 cc V8 engine became the basis for a number of different concept cars during the 1960s and 1970s, two of which ultimately resulted in production vehicles. Most made their appearances at the Auto Salon Genève. Here is a brief list:
 Gandini/Bertone Carabo (1968) – Marcello Gandini expressed ideas that would come to fruition in the Lamborghini Countach.
 Tipo 33.2 (1969)- Designed by Pininfarina using a design already known from a Ferrari concept car.
 Gandini/Bertone Montreal Concept (1967) – making its appearance at the 1967 Montreal Expo, this Giulia-based concept resulted in the production Alfa Romeo Montreal road car with a variant of the Tipo 33's V8 engine.
 Bertone/Giugiaro Navajo (1976)- A fully fibreglassed vehicle, and in some ways the epitome of Giugiaro's 'Origami' style of flat planes.

1980s-today – Modern ideas
In general, concept cars for Alfa Romeo have generally become production vehicles, after some modification to make them suitable for manufacture, and to provide driver and passenger safety. The Zagato SZ, GTV, and Spider, Brera, and 159 are all good examples of Alfa Romeo's stylistic commitment in this direction.

Logos

Original logo

Alfa Romeo's logo incorporates two heraldic devices traditionally associated with its birthplace, the city of Milan: A red cross, from the emblem of Milan, and the biscione, a big grass snake swallowing a child—emblem of the House of Visconti, rulers of the city in the 14th century.

The logo was originally designed in 1910 by a young Italian draughtsman from the A.L.F.A. technical office, Romano Cattaneo.

Origin
In June 1910, the Società Anonima Darracq became Anonima Lombarda Fabbrica Automobili, and was readying its first model, the 24 HP. The board asked chief engineer Giuseppe Merosi to devise a badge for the radiator shell of the new car; Merosi turned to his collaborators. One of them, Cattaneo, was inspired by the coat of arms he had seen on the gates of Castello Sforzesco to include the biscione in the logo. Merosi liked the idea, and together with Cattaneo came up with a sketch, then approved by managing director Ugo Stella; Cattaneo was entrusted with doing the final design.

In honour of the King of Italy, the two words were separated by two figure-eight knots—named Savoy knots in Italian, and symbols of the then-reigning House of Savoy. Originally solid brass, the lettering was changed to white enamel in 1913. In 1918, after the company had been bought by Nicola Romeo, the wording "ALFA" was replaced with "ALFA-ROMEO".

In 1925, to commemorate the victory of the Alfa Romeo P2 in the inaugural World Manufacturers' Championship of 1925, a silver metal laurel wreath was added around the badge, used (in varying form) until 1982.

Post-war evolution
In 1946, after the abolition of the monarchy and proclamation of the Italian Republic, the figure-eight knots of the Savoy were replaced with two curvy lines. Made of stamped steel, the new badge bore the traditional elements—the scripts, the cross, a newly stylized biscione and a thin laurel wreath—embossed in antique silver, over a uniform Alfa Red background, which had replaced the blue, white and light blue fields. This red-and-metal badge was used until 1950, when the company switched back to a traditionally enamelled and coloured one; in 1960 the badge was changed from brass to plastic, without substantial differences in design.

At the beginning of the 1970s the all-new Alfa Romeo Pomigliano d'Arco plant (near Naples) was completed. When in 1972 the Alfasud produced there became the first Alfa Romeo passenger car manufactured outside Milan, the word "Milano", the curved lines and the hyphen between "Alfa" and "Romeo" were eliminated from the badge on all Alfa Romeos. At the same time it was redesigned, most notably acquiring a modernised biscione and type face.

After a mild restyling in 1982, which deleted the wreath and changed lettering and all chrome details to gold, this iteration of the badge remained in use until 2015.

2015 redesign
On 24 June 2015, 105th anniversary of the company, a new logo was unveiled at a press event at the Alfa Romeo Museum; together with the Alfa Romeo Giulia as part of the brand's relaunch plan. The redesign was carried out by Robilant Associati, who had previously reworked several other Fiat Group logos—including Fiat Automobiles' and Lancia's.

The logo colors have been reduced from four to three: the green of the biscione, the red of the cross, and the dark blue of the surrounding ring. Other changes are a new serif type face, and the absence of the split white and light blue fields, replaced by a single silver textured background.

The Quadrifoglio logo

Since 1923, the quadrifoglio logo (also called the 'cloverleaf') has been the symbol of Alfa Romeo racing cars and since WWII, it has also been used to designate the higher trim models of the range. The quadrifoglio is usually placed on the side panels of the car, above or behind the front wheels—on the front wings in the case of modern vehicles. The logo consists of a green cloverleaf with four leaves, contained with a white triangle. There is "two Quadrifolio"
- Quadrifolio Verde
- Quadrifolio Oro

History of the emblem

The quadrifoglio has been used on Alfa Romeo cars since the death of Ugo Sivocci in 1923. As a friend of Enzo Ferrari, Sivocci was hired by Alfa Romeo in 1920 to drive in the four-man works team—Alfa Corse—with Antonio Ascari, Giuseppe Campari, and Enzo Ferrari. Sivocci was thought to have enormous experience, but often hampered by bad luck and considered the eternal second-placer. To banish his bad luck, when the Targa Florio came around, the driver painted a white square with a green four-leaf clover (the quadrifoglio) in the centre of the grille of his car. Sivocci had immediate success, crossing the finish line first. The quadrifoglio subsequently became the symbol of the racing Alfa Romeos with the victory at the Targa Florio. Almost as if to prove the magic effects of this symbol, Sivocci was killed while testing Merosi's new P1 at Monza, a few months after winning the Targa Florio. The Salerno driver's P1, which went off the track on a bend, did not have the quadrifoglio. Since this period in 1923, the bodies of Alfa Romeo racing cars have been adorned with the quadrifoglio as a lucky charm. The white square was replaced with a triangle in memory of Ugo Sivocci.

Modern usage
The first road car to bear the quadrifoglio was the 1963 Alfa Romeo Giulia TI Super, a variant of the Giulia saloon car devised for competition but put regularly on sale; it had green four-leaf clovers on its front wings, without the triangle.
In the 1970s "Quadrifoglio Verde" or "Green Cloverleaf" became the trim level for each model's sportiest variant, equipped with the most powerful engine. The Alfasud, Sprint, 33, 75, 164 and 145 all had Quadrifoglio Verde versions.
Also in the 1970s and through the 1980s golden four-leaf clover badges were used to denote the most luxurious and well-equipped variants of Alfa Romeo cars, named "Quadrifoglio Oro" or "Gold Cloverleaf".
The Alfasud, Alfetta, Alfa 6, 90 and 33 had Quadrifoglio Oro versions.
In recent times the quadrifoglio was revived on the 2007 Alfa Romeo 8C Competizione and Spider sports cars. With the current Alfa Romeo MiTo and Giulietta the Quadrifoglio Verde was reinstated as the sportiest trim level in the range, and green four-leaf clovers on the front wings are once again the hallmark of high-performance Alfa Romeos.
Alfa Romeo's 2016 sport sedan, the all-new Giulia, was launched first in Quadrifoglio trim before the release of the base models. Starting with the high-end model wearing that historic signature emblem.

Motorsport

Alfa Romeo has been involved with motor racing since 1911, when it entered two 24 HP models in Targa Florio competition. Alfa Romeo won the first World Manufacturers' Championship in 1925 and the first AIACR European Championship in 1931 and it scored wins at many races and motoring events such as Targa Florio, Mille Miglia and Le Mans. Great success continued with Formula One, when Alfa Romeo won the first World Formula One Championship in 1950 and won the second Formula One Championship in 1951. The company also won international championships in Prototypes, Touring and Fast Touring categories in the 1960s and 1970s. Private drivers also entered some rally competitions, with good results. Alfa Romeo has competed both as a constructor and an engine supplier, via works entries Alfa Corse, Autodelta and private entries. Alfa Romeo's factory racing team was outsourced to Enzo Ferrari's Scuderia Ferrari between 1933 and 1938. Drivers included Tazio Nuvolari, who won the 1935 German Grand Prix at the Nürburgring.

Alfa Romeo have been in a technical partnership with the Sauber F1 Team since 2018, and since 2019 have competed in Formula One solely as Alfa Romeo.

Alfa Romeo has won 5 FIA European Formula 3 Championships and 5 FIA European Formula 3 Cups with the support from the Alfa Romeo Stable Euroracing who created motor for the Formula 3 championship, and with the support of Italian motor company Novamotor which work in the Formula 3 competition.

Production

In the 1960s, the main Alfa Romeo factory was moved from inside Milan to a very large and nearby area extending over the municipalities of Arese, Lainate and Garbagnate Milanese. However, since then the factory was moved to Arese, as the offices and the main entrance of the area were located there.

In the late 1960s, a number of European automobile manufacturers established facilities in South Africa to assemble right hand drive vehicles. Fiat and other Italian manufacturers established factories along with these other manufacturers, Alfa-Romeos were assembled in Brits, outside Pretoria in the Transvaal Province of South Africa. With the imposition of sanctions by Western powers in the 1970s and 1980s, South Africa became self-sufficient, and in car production came to rely more and more on the products from local factories. This led to a set of circumstances where between 1972 and 1989, South Africa had the greatest number of Alfa Romeos on the road outside of Italy. The Alfa Romeos Brits plant was used from March 1983 until late 1985 to build Daihatsu Charades for local consumption, but also for export to Italy in order to skirt Italian limits on Japanese imports. For the last year the company was operating, the Daihatsu represented close to half of Alfa Romeo S.A. Ltd.'s total production.

In late 1985, with the impending Fiat takeover and an international boycott of the South African Apartheid government, Alfa Romeo withdrew from the market and closed the plant.

During the 1990s, Alfa Romeo moved car production to other districts in Italy. The Pomigliano d’Arco plant produced the 155, followed by the 145 and the 146, while the Arese plant manufactured the SZ and RZ sports cars, the 164, the new Spider and the GTV. The 156 was launched in 1997 and in 1998 was voted "Car of the Year". The same year a new flagship, the 166 (assembled in Rivalta, near Turin) was launched. At the beginning of the third millennium, the 147 was released, which won the title of "Car of the Year 2001". In 2003 the Arese factory was closed while only having some offices and the Alfa Romeo Historical Museum.

Automobiles
Alfa Romeos

Current models

Alfa Romeo Giulia
The new Giulia was unveiled to the press at the Museo Storico Alfa Romeo in Arese, on 24 June 2015. This coincided with the company's 105th anniversary and saw the introduction of a revised logo. Sales were about 34,000 examples per year (2018), then fell to 20,000 per year (2019).

Alfa Romeo Stelvio
The Stelvio was unveiled at the 2016 Los Angeles Auto Show. The Stelvio is Alfa Romeo's first production SUV that competes in the same category as the Porsche Macan, Jaguar F-Pace, Audi Q5, Mercedes-Benz GLC and BMW X3. It is current top Alfa sales with less than 40,000 examples per year (2019).

Alfa Romeo Tonale
The Tonale is a compact crossover SUV (C-segment) introduced in March 2022 and the first new model introduced by the brand in six years and the first model introduced under the brand of Stellantis.

Historic models

Carabinieri and Italian government 

In the 1960s, Alfa Romeo became famous for its small cars and models specifically designed for the Italian police and Carabinieri (arm of the Italian armed forces seconded only partly for civilian policing purposes); among them the "Giulia Super" and the 2600 Sprint GT. The colours of the Alfa Romeos used by the Polizia were/are green/blue with white stripes and writing, known as "Pantera" (Panther), enhancing the aggressive look of the cars (particularly the Giulia series), while the Carabinieri Alfas are dark blue with white roofs and red stripes, known as the "Gazzella" (Gazelle) denoting the speed and agility of these "Pattuglie" (patrol cars). However, the term "Pantera" became used interchangeably and the image helped create a no-nonsense, determined and respected perception by the general public of the men that drove these cars, true to their history.

Since then, Alfa Romeos remain the chosen mount of the Carabinieri, Polizia Autostradale (highway police), Guardia di Finanza (fiscal law enforcement) and the conventional police service (Polizia). Successively, the following Alfa Romeo cars have found favour for Italian police and government employment

• Alfa Romeo AR51
• Alfa Romeo Giulia
• Alfa Romeo Alfetta
• Alfa Romeo Giulietta
• Alfa Romeo 33 (Polizia di Stato only)
• Alfa Romeo 75
• Alfa Romeo 164 (official vehicles)
• Alfa Romeo 155
• Alfa Romeo 156
• Alfa Romeo 166 (official vehicles)
• Alfa Romeo 159
• Alfa Romeo Giulia (Carabinieri, 2 Giulia Quadrifoglio - Polizia di Stato, 2 Giulia Veloce Q4)

Since the 1960s, the Italian Prime Minister has used Alfa Romeos (and lately the new Maserati Quattroporte) as preferred government limousines. The 164 and 166 have found particular employment in the last two decades.

Trucks and light commercial vehicles

In 1930, Alfa Romeo presented a light truck in addition to heavy LCVs based on Büssing constructions. In the Second World War Alfa Romeo also built trucks for the Italian army ("35 tons anywhere") and later also for the German Wehrmacht. After the war, commercial motor vehicle production was resumed.

In co-operation with FIAT and Saviem starting from the 1960s different light truck models were developed.

The production of heavy LCVs in Italy was terminated in 1967. Heavy trucks continued to be built for a few years in Brazil by Alfa Romeo subsidiary Fábrica Nacional de Motores under the name FNM. The last Alfa Romeo vans were the Alfa Romeo AR6 and AR8, rebadged versions of Iveco Daily and Fiat Ducato. The company also produced trolleybuses for many systems in Italy, Latin America, Sweden, Greece, Germany, Turkey and South Africa. Later, Alfa Romeo concentrated only on passenger car manufacturing.

LCVs

 Alfa Romeo Romeo (1954–1958)
 Alfa Romeo Romeo 2 (until 1966)
 Alfa Romeo Romeo 3 (1966)
 Alfa Romeo A11/F11 (1954–1983)
 Alfa Romeo A12/F12
 AR8 (based on first generation Iveco Daily)
 AR6 (based on first generation Fiat Ducato)
 Alfa Romeo F20 (Saviem license)

Trucks
 Alfa Romeo 50 "Biscione" (Büssing-NAG 50)/ 80 (1931–1934)
 Alfa Romeo 85 / 110 (1934 – n/a)
 Alfa Romeo 350 (1935 – n/a)
 Alfa Romeo 430 (1942–1950)
 Alfa Romeo 450/455 (1947–1959)
 Alfa Romeo 500 (1937–1945)
 Alfa Romeo 800 (1940–1943)
 Alfa Romeo 900 (1947–1954)
 Alfa Romeo 950 (1954–1958)
 Alfa Romeo Mille (Alfa Romeo 1000) (1958–1964)
 Alfa Romeo A15 (Saviem license)
 Alfa Romeo A19 (Saviem license)
 Alfa Romeo A38 (Saviem license)

Buses
 Alfa Romeo 40A
 Alfa Romeo 80A
 Alfa Romeo 85A
 Alfa Romeo 110A
 Alfa Romeo 140A (1950–1958)
 Alfa Romeo 150A (1958)
 Alfa Romeo 430A (1949–1953)
 Alfa Romeo 500A (1945–1948)
 Alfa Romeo 800A
 Alfa Romeo 900A (1953–1956)
 Alfa Romeo 902A (1957–1959)
 Alfa Romeo 950A
 Alfa Romeo Mille (bus) (Alfa Romeo 1000) (1960–1964)

Trolleybuses
 Alfa Romeo 85AF (1936-1940)
 Alfa Romeo 110AF (1938)
 Alfa Romeo 140AF (1949)
 Alfa Romeo 800AF (1950–1954)
 Alfa Romeo 900AF (1955–1957)
 Alfa Romeo 911AF (1959–1960)
 Alfa Romeo Mille Aerfer (1960–1963)
 Alfa Romeo Mille AF (1959–1964)

Other production

Although Alfa Romeo is best known as automobile manufacturer it has also produced commercial vehicles of various size, railway locomotives, tractors, buses, trams, compressors, generators, an electric cooker, marine and aircraft engines.

Aircraft engines

An Alfa engine was first used on an aircraft in 1910 on the Santoni-Franchini biplane. In 1932 Alfa Romeo built its first real aircraft engine, the D2 (240 bhp), fitted to Caproni 101 D2. In the 1930s when Alfa Romeo engines were used for aircraft on a larger scale; the Savoia Marchetti SM.74, Savoia-Marchetti SM.75, Savoia-Marchetti SM.79, Savoia Marchetti SM.81 and Cant Z506B Airone all used Alfa Romeo manufactured engines. In 1931, a competition was arranged where Tazio Nuvolari drove his Alfa Romeo 8C 3000 Monza against a Caproni Ca.100 airplane. Alfa Romeo built various aircraft engines during the Second World War; the best known was the RA.1000 RC 41-I Monsone, a licensed version of the Daimler-Benz DB 601. This engine made it possible to build efficient fighter aircraft like the Macchi C.202 Folgore for the Italian army. After the Second World War Alfa Romeo produced engines for Fiat, Aerfer and Ambrosini. In the 1960s Alfa Romeo mainly focused upgrading and maintaining Curtiss-Wright, Pratt & Whitney, Rolls-Royce and General Electric aircraft engines. Alfa Romeo also built Italy's first turbine engine, installed to the Beechcraft King Air. Alfa Romeo's Avio division was sold to Aeritalia in 1988, from 1996 it was part of Fiat Avio. Alfa Avio was also part of developing team to the new T700-T6E1 engine to the NHI NH90 helicopter.

Marine engines

Alfa Romeo also produced marine engines. The first marine engine was produced in 1929. Later, for three consecutive years: 1937-1938-1939 with remarkable affirmations, Alfa Romeo demonstrated its constructive efficiency by contributing to the development of marine engines.
 (1938) 12 cyl (4.500) 121,710 km/h

Aero-engines
 Alfa Romeo D2
 Alfa Romeo 110
 Alfa Romeo 115
 Alfa Romeo 121
 Alfa Romeo 125
 Alfa Romeo 126
 Alfa Romeo 128
 Alfa Romeo 135
 Alfa Romeo Lynx
 Alfa Romeo Mercurius
 Alfa Romeo RA.1000
 Alfa Romeo RA-1050
 Alfa Romeo R.C.10
 Alfa Romeo R.C.34
 Alfa Romeo R.C.35
 Alfa Romeo AR.318

Marketing and sponsorship

During the years Alfa Romeo has been marketed with different slogans like: "The family car that wins races" used in the 1950s in Alfa Romeo 1900 marketing campaign, "racing since 1911" used on most 1960s Alfa advertisements. In the 1970s the Alfa Romeo 1750 GTV was marketed as "if this kind of handling is good enough for our racing cars, it's good enough for you." The Giulia Sprint GTA was marketed as "The car you drive to work is a champion".
More recent slogans used are "Mediocrity is a sin", "Driven by Passion", "Cuore Sportivo", "Beauty is not enough" and present day "Without heart we would be mere machines". Also other more recent ones are: "It's not a car, it's an Alfa Romeo.", one of them after a couple argue in Italian.

As part of its marketing policy, Alfa Romeo sponsors a number of sporting events, such as the Mille Miglia rally. It has sponsored the SBK Superbike World Championship and Ducati Corse since 2007, and the Goodwood Festival of Speed for many years, and was one of the featured brands in 2010 when Alfa Romeo celebrated its 100th anniversary. The Alfa Romeo Giulietta has been used since Monza 2010 race as the safety car in Superbike World Championship events. Alfa Romeo has been also shirt sponsor of Eintracht Frankfurt football club in period between 2013 and 2016.

In 2002, Alfa Romeo I, the first Alfa Romeo super maxi yacht was launched. It finished first in at least 74 races including the 2002 Sydney—Hobart Race. Alfa Romeo II, commissioned in 2005, measures  LOA. It set a new elapsed-time record for monohulls in the 2009 Transpac race, of 5 days, 14 hours, 36 minutes, 20 seconds. It finished first in at least 140 races. In mid-2008 Alfa Romeo III was launched for competitive fleet racing under the IRC rule. Alfa Romeo III measures  LOA and features interior design styled after the Alfa Romeo 8C Competizione.

The BBC motoring show Top Gear repeatedly argued the significance of owning an Alfa Romeo car as a car enthusiast, stating that "You can't be a true petrolhead if you have never owned/or wanted to own an Alfa Romeo". Presenters Jeremy Clarkson, Richard Hammond and James May continuously praised Alfas for their beauty and driving characteristics even though Italian cars had a long-term bad reputation for unreliability. They argued that you (the owner) build a personal relationship with the car despite all of its mechanical faults. Both Clarkson and May have previously owned Alfas (a GTV6 for Clarkson and an Alfa 164 for May) and both have stated that they regretted selling their Alfas the most.

As part of its U.S. relaunch, Alfa Romeo ran three commercials during Super Bowl LI; the brand was the sole marque advertised by FCA during the game, after exclusively focusing on its Jeep brand at Super Bowl 50.

In February 2013, Alfa Romeo sponsored University of St Andrews FS fashion show which saw luxury fashion designer Luke Archer and milliner George Jenkins win with their Alfa Romeo inspired garments.

Alfa Romeo announced Zhou Guanyu as China's first ever Formula One racing driver for the 2022 season, hailed by both the team and the sport as a historic breakthrough in a key growth market.

See also

 Alfa Romeo Arese Plant
 Alfa Romeo Pomigliano d'Arco Plant
 Alfa Romeo Portello Plant
 Alfa Romeo Museum
 Circuito di Balocco
 Alfa Romeo in motorsport
 :Category: Alfa Romeo engines
 :Category: Alfa Romeo people

Notes

References

Further reading
 Borgeson, Griffith (1990). The Alfa Romeo Tradition.  Haynes (Foulis) Publishing Group. Somerset, UK. .
 Braden, Pat (1994). Alfa Romeo Owner's Bible Cambridge: Bentley Publishers. .
 Stefano d' Amico and Maurizio Tabuchi (2004). Alfa Romeo Production Cars.  Giorgio NADA Editore. .
 Hull and Slater (1982). Alfa Romeo: a History. Transport Bookman Publications. .
 Venables, David (2000). First among Champions. Osceola: Motorbooks International. .
 Owen, David. Great Marques, Alfa Romeo. London: Octopus Books, 1985. 
 Owen, David. Alfa Romeo: Always with Passion. Haynes Publications, 1999. 
 Moore, Simon (1987). Immortal 2.9. Parkside Pubns. .
 Mcdonough, E., & Collins, P. (2005). Alfa Romeo Tipo 33. Veloce Publishing. 
 Tipler, John. Alfa Romeo Spider, The complete history. Crowood Press (UK), 1998. 
 Tipler, John. Alfa Romeo Giulia Coupe Gt & Gta. Veloce Publishing, 2003. 
 Styles, David G. "Alfa Romeo – The Legend Revived", Dalton Watson 1989. 
 Styles, David G. "Alfa Romeo – Spider, Alfasud & Alfetta GT", Crowood Press 1992. 
 Styles, David G. "Alfa Romeo – The Spirit of Milan", Sutton Publishing 1999.

External links

 

 
Stellantis
Sports car manufacturers
Trolleybus manufacturers
Milan motor companies
World Sportscar Championship teams
Defunct bus manufacturers
Defunct truck manufacturers
Aircraft engine manufacturers of Italy
Italian companies established in 1910
Vehicle manufacturing companies established in 1910
Italian brands
Formerly government-owned companies of Italy
Car brands
Luxury motor vehicle manufacturers
Electric vehicle manufacturers of Italy
Car manufacturers of Italy
Turin motor companies